Essex County is a county in the northeastern part of the U.S. state of Massachusetts. At the 2020 census, the total population was 809,829, making it the third-most populous county in the state, and the eightieth-most populous in the country. It is part of the Greater Boston area (the Boston–Cambridge–Newton, MA–NH Metropolitan Statistical Area). The largest city in Essex County is Lynn. The county was named after the English county of Essex. It has two traditional county seats: Salem and Lawrence. Prior to the dissolution of the county government in 1999, Salem had jurisdiction over the Southern Essex District, and Lawrence had jurisdiction over the Northern Essex District, but currently these cities do not function as seats of government. However, the county and the districts remain as administrative regions recognized by various governmental agencies, which gathered vital statistics or disposed of judicial case loads under these geographic subdivisions, and are required to keep the records based on them. The county has been designated the Essex National Heritage Area by the National Park Service.

History

The county was created by the General Court of the Massachusetts Bay Colony on May 10, 1643, when it was ordered "that the whole plantation within this jurisdiction be divided into four sheires". Named after the county in England, Essex then comprised the towns of Salem, Lynn, Wenham, Ipswich, Rowley, Newbury, Gloucester and Andover. In 1680, Haverhill, Amesbury and Salisbury, located north of the Merrimack River, were annexed to Essex County. These communities had been part of Massachusetts' colonial-era Norfolk County. The remaining four towns within colonial Norfolk County, which included Exeter and what is now Portsmouth, were transferred to what became Rockingham County in the Province of New Hampshire. The Massachusetts-based settlements were then subdivided over the centuries to produce Essex County's modern composition of cities and towns.

Essex County is where Elbridge Gerry (who was born and raised in Marblehead) created a legislative district in 1812 that gave rise to the word gerrymandering.

Due to a confluence of floods, hurricanes, and severe winter storms, Essex County has had more disaster declarations than most other U.S. counties, from 1964 to 2016.

Law and government
From the founding of the Republican Party until the New Deal, Essex County was a Republican stronghold in presidential elections. Since 1936, it has trended Democratic, with Dwight Eisenhower in 1952 and 1956 and Ronald Reagan in 1980 and 1984 being the only Republicans to carry the county since.

|}

Like several other Massachusetts counties, Essex County exists today only as a historical geographic region, and has no county government. All former county functions were assumed by state agencies in 1999. The sheriff (currently Kevin Coppinger) and some other regional officials with specific duties are still elected locally to perform duties within the county region, but there is no county council, commissioner, or county employees. Communities are now granted the right to form their own regional compacts for sharing services.

Geography
Essex County is roughly diamond-shaped and occupies the northeastern corner of the state of Massachusetts.

Essex County is adjacent to Rockingham County, New Hampshire to the north, the Atlantic Ocean (specifically the Gulf of Maine and Massachusetts Bay) to the east, Suffolk County to the south, Middlesex County to the west and a very small portion of Hillsborough County, New Hampshire to the far north west in Methuen. All county land is incorporated into towns or cities.

Essex County includes the North Shore, Cape Ann, and the lower portions of the Merrimack Valley.

Transportation
These routes pass through Essex County:
 , in Methuen and Andover
 , about five miles from the coast, through Newburyport
 , from Andover to Salisbury through Lawrence and Haverhill
 , between I-95 and Route 1A, close to the coast
 , along the coast
 , in Beverly and Essex
 , in Methuen and Andover
 , in Peabody and Danvers
 , from Middleton to Beverly
 , from Methuen to Beverly
 , in Saugus
 , from Saugus to Beverly 
 , in Haverhill
 , from Methuen to Salisbury through Lawrence and Haverhill
 , from Methuen to Newburyport through Haverhill 
 , from Lawrence to Marblehead through Middleton
 , from Andover to Haverhill
 , from Beverly to Gloucester
 , at the tip of Cape Ann
 , Lynnfield through Cape Ann
 , from Lynnfield to Marblehead
 , in Lynn
 , from Andover to Gloucester
 , in Amesbury
 , in Methuen
 , in Salisbury

The Lawrence Municipal Airport and Beverly Municipal Airport are regional airports within the county; the nearest commercial airports are Logan Airport in Boston and Manchester-Boston Regional Airport in Manchester, NH.

The MBTA commuter rail has two lines operating in Essex County: the Haverhill Line and the Newburyport Line, both of which go toward Boston. Close to Boston, MBTA buses also exist. The MVRTA is a bus company that connects cities within the Merrimack Valley portion of Essex County.

National protected areas
Because of Essex County's rich history, which includes 17th century colonial history, maritime history spanning its existence, and leadership in the expansions of the textile industry in the 19th century, the entire county has been designated the Essex National Heritage Area by the National Park Service.

The following areas of national significance have also been preserved:
 Parker River National Wildlife Refuge
 Salem Maritime National Historic Site
 Saugus Iron Works National Historic Site
 Thacher Island National Wildlife Refuge

Demographics

As of the 2010 United States Census, there were 743,159 people, 285,956 households, and 188,005 families residing in the county. The racial makeup of the county was 81.9% White, 3.8% Black or African American, 3.1% Asian, 0.4% American Indian, 8.2% from other races, and 2.6% from two or more races. Those of Hispanic or Latino origin made up 16.5% of the population. In terms of ancestry, 23.3% were Irish, 17.1% were Italian, 12.6% were English, 6.1% were German, and 3.6% were American.

Of the 285,956 households, 32.9% had children under the age of 18 living with them, 47.9% were married couples living together, 13.5% had a female householder with no husband present, 34.3% were non-families, and 28.1% of all households were made up of individuals. The average household size was 2.54 and the average family size was 3.14. The median age was 40.4 years.

The median income for a household in the county was $64,153 and the median income for a family was $81,173. Males had a median income of $58,258 versus $44,265 for females. The per capita income for the county was $33,828. About 7.7% of families and 10.1% of the population were below the poverty line, including 13.3% of those under age 18 and 9.4% of those age 65 or over.

Demographic breakdown by town

Income

The ranking of unincorporated communities that are included on the list are reflective if the census designated locations and villages were included as cities or towns. Data is from the 2007-2011 American Community Survey 5-Year Estimates.

Politics

Education
Essex County is home to numerous libraries and schools, both public and private.

School districts
School districts include:

K-12:

 Amesbury School District
 Andover School District
 Beverly School District
 Danvers School District
 Georgetown School District
 Gloucester School District
 Hamilton-Wenham School District
 Haverhill School District
 Ipswich School District
 Lawrence School District
 Lynn School District
 Lynnfield School District
 Manchester Essex Regional School District
 Marblehead School District
 Methuen School District
 Newburyport School District
 North Andover School District
 Peabody School District
 Pentucket School District
 Rockport School District
 Salem School District
 Saugus School District
 Swampscott School District - Covers PK-12 except in Nahant, where it covers grades 7-12 only
 Triton School District

Secondary:
 Masconomet School District

Elementary:
 Boxford School District
 Middleton School District
 Nahant School District
 Topsfield School District

Secondary education

Public schools

 Amesbury High School serves Amesbury and South Hampton, New Hampshire
 Andover High School
 Beverly High School
 Danvers High School
 Georgetown High School
 Gloucester High School
 Hamilton-Wenham Regional High School
 Haverhill High School
 Ipswich High School
 Lawrence High School
 Lynn Classical High School
 Lynn English High School
 Lynnfield High School
 Manchester Essex Regional High School
 Marblehead High School
 Masconomet Regional High School, serves Topsfield, Boxford and Middleton
 Methuen High School
 Newburyport High School
 North Andover High School
 Northshore Academy
 Peabody Veterans Memorial High School
 Pentucket Regional High School, serves Groveland, Merrimac and West Newbury
 Rockport High School
 Salem High School
 Saugus High School
 Swampscott High School, serves Swampscott and Nahant
 Triton Regional High School, serves Newbury, Rowley and Salisbury
 Walnut Square Elementary School, in Haverhill is known for its history and clocktower.

Technical schools

Private schools

Higher education

Libraries
 Merrimack Valley Library Consortium - Northern Essex and Middlesex County Libraries
 North of Boston Library Exchange - Southern Essex and Middlesex County Libraries

Economy

Employment
As of 2015, the county had total employment of 282,412. The largest employer in the county is Massachusetts General Hospital, with over 5,000 employees.

Banking
Based on deposits in the county, the five largest banks are TD Bank, N.A., Salem Five Cents Bank, Institution for Savings, Bank of America, and Eastern Bank.

Essex National Heritage Area

On November 12, 1996, Essex National Heritage Area (ENHA) was authorized by Congress. The heritage area consists of all of Essex County, MA a  area between the Atlantic Coast and the Merrimack Valley. The area includes 34 cities and towns; two National Historic Sites (Salem Maritime National Historic Site and Saugus Iron Works National Historic Site); and thousands of historic sites and districts that illuminate colonial settlement, the development of the shoe and textile industries, and the growth and decline of the maritime industries, including fishing, privateering, and the China trade. The Essex National Heritage Area is one of 49 heritage areas designated by Congress, affiliated with the National Park Service.

The Essex National Heritage Commission is a non-profit organization chartered to promote tourism and cultural awareness of the area, connecting people to the places of Essex County, MA. The commission's mission is to promote and preserve the historic, cultural and natural resources of the ENHA by rallying community support around saving the character of the area. This is accomplished through the commission's projects and programs, which include Partnership Grant Program, Explorers membership program, photo safaris, and the annual September weekend event Trails & Sails, as well as other important regional partnership building projects like the Essex Heritage Scenic Byway, and the Border to Boston trail.

Communities
The towns and cities of Essex County are listed below.

Cities

 Amesbury
 Beverly
 Gloucester
 Haverhill
 Lawrence (traditional county seat)
 Lynn
 Methuen
 Newburyport
 Peabody
 Salem (traditional county seat)

Towns

 Andover
 Boxford
 Danvers (Salem Village)
 Essex
 Georgetown
 Groveland
 Hamilton
 Ipswich
 Lynnfield
 Manchester-by-the-Sea
 Marblehead
 Merrimac
 Middleton
 Nahant
 Newbury
 North Andover
 Rockport
 Rowley
 Salisbury
 Saugus
 Swampscott
 Topsfield
 Wenham
 West Newbury

Census-designated places

Andover
Boxford
Essex
Ipswich
Rockport
Rowley
Salisbury
Topsfield

Other villages

Annisquam
Ballardvale
Beverly Farms
Bradford
Byfield
Clifton
Magnolia
Merrimacport
Rocks Village
Plum Island

See also

 List of Massachusetts locations by per capita income
 Essex Junto
 Tinker's Island
 Lovecraft Country
 Registry of Deeds (Massachusetts)
 National Register of Historic Places listings in Essex County, Massachusetts

Notes

References
 
 
 
 
Hurd, Duane Hamilton. History of Essex County, Massachusetts: With Biographical Sketches of Many Pioneers and Prominent Men. Volume 1. Volume 2 Published 1888 by J.W. Lewis and Co.
 Newhall, James Robinson. The Essex Memorial, for 1836: Embracing a Register of the County.  Published 1836.
 Lewis, Alonzo and James Robinson Newhall.  History of Lynn, Essex County, Massachusetts: Including Lynnfield,Saugus, Swampscott and Nahant.Published 1865 by John L. Shorey 13 Washington St. Lynn.
 Perley, Sidney. The Essex Antiquarian. Volume 1 1897.Volume 3 1899.Volume 6 1902.Volume 8 1904
 Various. Early Massachusetts Vital Records 1600–1849

Further reading

External links

Registries
  Located in Salem, Massachusetts.
  Located in Lawrence, Massachusetts.

Maps

Other sites
  Official website.
  Official website.
 
Essex County Sheriff's Department

 
1643 establishments in Massachusetts
1999 disestablishments in Massachusetts
Counties in Greater Boston
Massachusetts counties
Populated places disestablished in 1999
Populated places established in 1643